The 1849 Grand National Steeplechase was the 11th official annual running of a handicap steeplechase horse race at Aintree Racecourse near Liverpool on Wednesday, 28 February. It attracted a field of twenty-four competitors for a prize valued at £825.

The race was won by Tom Cunningham on Finch Mason's Peter Simple, having also trained the horse himself. Cunningham wore Finch Mason's colours of green silks with salmon sleeves and pink cap. (*there was no Liverpool Mercury published on this date. Unsure where the source found the info on the colours) The horse won in a time of 10 minutes 56 seconds, seventeen seconds slower than the course record set two years earlier. For the second consecutive year there were three equine fatalities during the race, taking the number of fatalities in the history of the race to eight and leading to heavy criticism in the press. The owner was not the same Finch Mason who achieved fame painting racing scenes in the latter half of the 19th century.

Leading contenders
Prince George was sent off as the 4/1 favourite as the mount of Tom Olliver who was also the most experienced rider in the race, being the only man to have taken part in every official National. The duel winning rider was one of several to benefit from a false start, which was not recalled, the roars of encouragement from nearby spectators drowning out the calls of starter, Lord Sefton to recall the runners. The favourite remained prominent until the runners approached the racecourse for the final time where Olliver realised he had nothing left to offer, being nursed home a distant third to finish.

The Curate had been a long time pre race favourite in the betting rooms of Manchester where most pre race wagers were struck, having been beaten by just half a length in the previous year's race. With Tom Olliver's defection to the favourite it was Horatio Powell who took the ride in what proved to be his last of seven rides in the race, including one regarded as unofficial, being sent off at 7/1. Powell was one of those caught out in the false start and, in desperately trying to make back the lost ground, blundered and fell at the second fence, the vet having to be summoned to end the horse's pain when he was found to be badly injured.

The Knight of Gwynne found popularity on the day of the race from those spectators with military affiliations as the horse was to be ridden by his owner Captain D'Arcy who was one of nine riders making his debut in the race. The Captain himself placed sizable bets on his mount winning, being sent off at 8/1. It is unclear whether the horse managed to get away among those in the false start but at the start of the second circuit he had moved through the field to take position behind the eventual winner. However, his rider found that his horse had little to offer upon turning for home and resorted to shouting ahead to his rival to take a pull, meaning to deliberately slow his horse in order to allow The Knight of Gwynne to pass and win the race. The Captain's first offer was £1,000 to his rival, though, as his desperation to win increased, so did his offer, to £4,000 before the winner passed the post three lengths clear. With no official governing body in place for the sport at the time D'Arcy had technically broken no rules in offering financial inducements to another rider and the only action that could be taken would have been for Lord Sefton to ban him from competing or entering horses at Aintree again. History does not record if Sefton took this action but D'Arcy never again competed or entered horses at Liverpool.

Proceed was another mount of an owner and military Captain, William Peel who was taking his fifth ride in the race and had been thought to have had a share in the ownership of the previous year's winner of the race. Like D'Arcy, Peel gained great support from those in military circles and was also sent off at 8/1. Peel was among those who were part of the false start and was well placed behind the leader at the end of the first circuit but the second time round took its toll and the tired horse fell when beaten in the latter stages of the race.

Wolverhampton was owned by the 1840 winner rider, Bartholomew Bretherton who took the ride himself, making it his eighth, when unofficial pre 1839 Nationals are included. Bretherton was a local man from a well known family and as such found popular support on the course for his mount, who was sent off at 12/1 but was never involved at the business end of the race and fell at a fence alongside the Canal on the second circuit. Bretherton never again took part in a National, though he remained a regular visitor to Aintree over the next quarter of a century.

The British Yeoman returned after finishing third in the previous year's race and was again partnered by Charles Bevill, taking his third and final ride in the National. The former flat race, who had once been well fancied in the Epsom Derby was sent off at 12/1 but never got into contention and finished last of the six recorded finishers.

Alfred was the mount of 1847 winner Denny Wynne, who was having his fourth ride in the race and had already become the popular rider among Irish visitors to Aintree. Wynne guided his mount through the problems of the race without ever challenging the leader to finish fourth.

Peter Simple was among the each way chances at 20/1 and won the race without ever being headed, going to the front at the head of those who broke with a false start.

The Course
While the course was almost as it is today the fences to be jumped were mostly the natural hedges banks and ditches that they encountered along the route rather than the man made obstacles of the modern era. The land away from the main section of the racecourse, known today as the country during the National was indeed open countryside and was being farmed, resulting in the fields the horses ran across being either ploughed or grazing land, only the racecourse itself was laid to turf or contained man made obstacles.

Riders instructions when racing in the country were simply to stay outside a set of flags which had been placed on the inner ring of the course and while these aimed to direct the riders towards the jumps, such as Becher's Brook, Canal Turn and Valentine's Brook they did not necessarily have to jump the fences and could instead take a wider path along country lanes if they felt the route worthwhile, however by 1849 it was rare for any rider to gain an advantage by taking a route, which bypassed a fence.

As a result of the make up of the course and fences the Grand National of 1849 would have more resembled a fox hunt than a steeplechase to a modern observer while press reporters relayed the action in their newspapers as the runners crossing from field to field rather than from fence to fence.

A map of the course from 1848 shows that the start was at a location which today sits halfway between Melling Road and the first fence. Becher's Brook was the fifth fence the runners jumped before making for the Canal Turn, fence seven, and Valentine's Brook, fence eight. Two further fences were jumped alongside the Canal before the runners jumped into and out of the lane that divided the racecourse from the countryside beyond, today known as Anchor Bridge crossing. Thus the runners had jumped eleven obstacles on the first circuit before entering the racecourse where they jumped the monument fence, today known as the chair, followed by the water jump, both of these fences had to be jumped.

The runners then crossed the lane again, jumping a fence as they did so which they had not jumped on the first circuit to set off on the second circuit. The line of country run towards Becher's for the second time was slightly different from the first as the runners jumped the first fence of the second circuit some fifty metres away from where they would have met it first time around. As they continued towards Becher's they would meet each fence at a closer point to where they jumped on the first circuit until the two paths of the first and second circuits finally met at Becher's itself, this time being the nineteenth fence. The runners then followed the same path as first time round with the Canal Turn being fence twenty-one and Valentine's Brook being fence twenty-two. After jumping out of the lane, which this time was fence twenty-five, the runners once again deviated from the first circuit, this time having to continue out to the widest extreme of the racecourse before turning into the home straight, on the first circuit they followed the path used today.

By taking the widest extreme of the course the runners then had a home run of about a quarter of a mile in front of all of the stands and enclosures, this being deliberately designed to give as many spectators as possible a close up view of the action. A hurdle was placed halfway up the run in, this being the twenty-sixth and final flight. The winning post was about thirty metres beyond its present location at the very end of the straight.

Finishing order

No official returns for the Grand National exist prior to 1865. The return below is taken from the account published by the reporter of The Times newspaper the day after the race. While all the newspapers that reported on the race agree with the finishing order of the six who passed the post they are often at odds over the fate of those who did not complete the course, resulting in many different accounts of what fate befell each competitor that did not complete. The press of the day are in agreement that three horses were killed and that there was some melee at the third fence on the second circuit, which resulted in several competitors being knocked out of the race.

The custom among riders at the time would have been to continue in the race unless impossible to do so, regardless of how many times they had met with mishap. Therefore, many of the competitors would have been remounted once or more during the race, or put to fences again after refusing. Only those horses that had been injured, run loose after falling, persistently refused an obstacle or had riders too injured or fatigued to continue would not have completed the course. As a result, a judge was placed on a chair on a pedestal situated alongside the thorn fence on the course, which became known as the Monument fence. His job was to record all the horses that he could see on the finishing straight at the point the first horse in the race reached his position. Only these horses would be recorded as finishers and any that followed on after were regarded under the term 'distanced'. This however added to the confusion of exactly how many horses finished in the Grand Nationals prior to 1865 when the practice was done away with.

The race was threatened by the potential for snow in the twenty-four hours leading up to the race but it never came and the race was run on very heavy ground, which most of the competitors struggled on, especially through the ploughed land.

The starter, Lord Sefton attempted to recall the runners from a false start but was drowned out by the crowd in the proximity of the start whose shouts of encouragement made a recall impossible. Despite the starter stating clearly that the race was a false start the result was allowed to stand.

The race was noted for a pile up at the third fence on the second circuit, which may have accounted for some of the six runners whose fate is not recorded. In addition a journalist, writing for the London Illustrated News, reported that he walked the course some twenty minutes after the race and found three horses at the second, third and fourth fences, each lying dead where they fell, having been destroyed by the vet.

Unquoted horses were those offered by bookmakers at any price they felt fair, usually 66 or 100/1. Bookmakers only issued a quoted price for a horse when the odds being asked for by the public suggested that the bookmaker stood to make a loss if said horse were to win.

References

 1849
1849 in horse racing
Grand National
19th century in Lancashire
February 1849 sports events